Terrific may refer to:

"Terrific" (song), by Drake Bell
Terrific (comics), 1960s British comics